The 2019 Duquesne Dukes football team represented Duquesne University as a member of the Northeast Conference (NEC) during the 2019 NCAA Division I FCS football season. They were led by 15th-year head coach Jerry Schmitt and played their home games at Arthur J. Rooney Athletic Field. Duquesne compiled an overall record of 6–5 with a mark of 4–3 in conference play, tying for third place in the NEC.

Previous season

The Dukes finished the 2018 season 9–4, 5–1 in NEC play to be NEC co-champions with Sacred Heart. Due to their head-to-head win over Sacred Heart, they received the NEC's automatic bid to the FCS playoffs where they defeated Towson in the first round before losing in the second round to South Dakota State.

Preseason

Preseason coaches' poll
The NEC released their preseason coaches' poll on July 24, 2019. The Dukes were picked to finish in first place.

Preseason All-NEC team
The Dukes had nine players at eight positions selected to the preseason all-NEC team.

Offense

Daniel Parr – QB

AJ Hines – RB

Kellon Taylor – WR

Gabe Spurlock – OL

Matt Womack – OL

Defense

Kam Carter – DL

Brett Zanotto – LB

Reid Harrison-Ducros – DB

Specialists

Mitch Maczura – K

Schedule

Game summaries

Walsh

at Youngstown State

at Dayton

at New Hampshire

LIU

at Sacred Heart

Wagner

Saint Francis

at Robert Morris

at Bryant

Central Connecticut

Ranking movements

References

Duquesne
Duquesne Dukes football seasons
Duquesne Dukes football